The NWA World Junior Heavyweight Championship is a professional wrestling world championship in the National Wrestling Alliance. Created in 1945, the title is competed for by junior heavyweight wrestlers.

History 
The first NWA World Junior Heavyweight Champion was Ken Fenelon, who was awarded the title on May 15, 1945 by promoter Paul "Pinkie" George, the co-founder and inaugural president of the National Wrestling Alliance. For the first few years of its existence, the title was contested largely in Iowa, where George's promotion was based.

Between 1948 and 1952, the title was unified with other junior heavyweight titles. After winning the title in December 1948, Leroy McGuirk defeated the National Wrestling Association World Junior Heavyweight Champion Billy Goelz in 1949 to unify the two titles. McGuirk vacated the title in February 1950 after being blinded in a car accident, forcing him to retire. Verne Gagne won the vacant title in November 1950, defeating Sonny Myers in the final of a tournament, after which he was presented with the title belt by McGuirk. Gagne lost the title to Danny McShain one year later in November 1951. In May 1952, McShain unified the NWA World Junior Heavyweight Championship with the Los Angeles version of the NWA World Junior Heavyweight Championship ' by defeating Rito Romero.

In 1960, Danny Hodge had a heated feud with Angelo Savoldi over the NWA World Junior Heavyweight Championship. During a bout between the two men on May 27, 1960 in Oklahoma City, Oklahoma, Hodge's father Bill Hodge Sr. entered the ring and legitimately stabbed Savoldi.

In 1973,  Gulf Coast Championship Wrestling (GCCW)'s wrestler Wrestling Pro faced Ken Mantell for the championship. During the match, the referee was knocked out and Pro won the match, but a second referee appeared and declared Mantell as the winner. The promoter Bob Kelly appeared and said that Wrestling Pro was the new champion and gave him a title belt. During that time, Pro was recognized as champion in the GCCW territory, but not recognized by the NWA. 49 days later, Mantell defeated Wrestling Pro to claim both titles.

In March 1976, Hodge vacated the title after being injured in a car accident, marking the end of his record seventh reign as champion.

In 1979, after the title was vacated, Steve Keirn defeated Chavo Guerrero Sr. in the finals of a tournament to win the title. However, Keirn was recognized as champion by New Japan Pro-Wrestling, as well as the Los Angeles and Florida NWA territories, but not by the NWA as a whole. The title Keirn held was later renamed the NWA International Junior Heavyweight Championship.

In 1983, the title had two different lineages. The NWA recognized champion was The Cobra, who worked for NJPW. The Cobra held the title from 1983 until 1984, when he lost it against Hiro Saito. However, he regained the title that same day. The Cobra retained the title until 1985, when NJPW separated from NWA. During that time, in 1983, Les Thornton was recognized as champion by Georgia Championship Wrestling. The title was vacated when he joined WWF and, Jim Crockett Promotions gave the title to Hector Guerrero in 1984. Guerrero lost the championship against Mike Davis and, at Starrcade 84, Davis lost the title to Denny Brown. When The Cobra was stripped from the title in 1985, NWA vice president Shohei Baba recognized Davis as the official champion.

In 1996, a tournament was held to unify eight different championship belts from five different organizations, including NWA's. The tournament to crown the first champions was held over four nights, from August 2 to August 5, 1996, the same dates that New Japan Pro-Wrestling's annual G1 Climax event took place, promoting two major tournaments on one tour. Jushin Thunder Liger is credited with coming up with the idea for the J-Crown. The inaugural champion was The Great Sasuke. The J-Crown was defended for just over a year. While Ultimo Dragon was champion, the titles appeared on World Championship Wrestling programming, as Dragon also held the WCW Cruiserweight Championship and the NWA World Middleweight Championship at the time. When Liger was champion, he lost the WAR International Junior Heavyweight Championship to Yuji Yasuraoka on June 6, 1997, in Tokyo, Japan. Liger, however, continued to defend the J-Crown with seven titles instead of eight. As part of their introduction of a new WWF Light Heavyweight Championship, the World Wrestling Federation demanded that the then current champion Shinjiro Otani return the belt. Otani dissolved the J-Crown on November 5, 1997, by vacating all of  the component titles except for the IWGP Junior Heavyweight Championship, with the other belts being restored to their home promotions. When the title was returned to NWA, the held the title vacated until 1999, when Logan Caine won a tournament.

In 2011, The Sheik was the NWA World Heavyweight Champion but was stripped of the championship for refusing to defend against Adam Pearce. The Junior Heavyweight Champion Craig Classic vacated the title in protest. Pro Wrestling Zero1 did not recognize the vacancy and recognised Classic as the real champion.

In 2014, NWA began to work with New Japan Pro Wrestling. The champion at that time, Chase Owens, defended the title in several NJPW events. During the working relationship, Jushin Thunder Liger and Tiger Mask held the title. On May 1, 2017, Billy Corgan's company, Lightning One, Inc., purchased the NWA, including its name, rights, trademarks, and championships. As a result, the NWA World Junior Heavyweight Championship was vacated. Corgan's ownership took effect on October 1, 2017. The title was vacant until March 2022 when Homicide won the title on night two of the 2022 Crockett Cup.

Title history

Combined reigns

See also
WWF Light Heavyweight Championship
WCW Light Heavyweight Championship
WWE Cruiserweight Championship (1996–2007)
NXT Cruiserweight Championship

References

External links
National Wrestling Alliance World Junior Heavyweight Title History
National Wrestling Association Junior Heavyweight Title History

Jim Crockett Promotions championships
National Wrestling Alliance championships
New Japan Pro-Wrestling championships
Junior heavyweight wrestling championships
World professional wrestling championships